Dykes, Dyke or Dikes may refer to:

People
 Dyke (slang), used as a noun meaning lesbian or used as an adjective to describe things associated with lesbians
 Dykes Potter (1910–2002), American baseball player 
 Dykes (surname)

Places
 Dykes, Missouri

See also
 Dikes, diagonal pliers, also called side-cutting pliers, a hand tool used by electricians and others
 Dykes on Bikes, a group of motorcyclists
 Dykes, Camera, Action!, a documentary of 2018
 Dykes & Gorgons, a lesbian magazine of the 1970s
 Dykes to Watch Out For, a comic strip
 Dyke (disambiguation)